Smiley Gets a Gun is a 1958 Australian comedy-drama film in CinemaScope directed by Anthony Kimmins and starring Sybil Thorndike and Chips Rafferty. It is the sequel to the 1956 film Smiley.

Synopsis
A young boy named Smiley desperately wants a gun. A deal is made between him and Sergeant Flaxman that if he gets 8 nicks (marks on a certain tree) for his good deeds he will get a .22 caliber £2 rifle. He has several adventures and is accused of stealing some gold. Smiley runs away but the real thief is caught and Smiley is rewarded with a gun.

Cast

 Keith Calvert as Smiley Greevins
 Alexander ( Bruce) Thomas as Smiley Greevins on horse
 Bruce Archer as Joey
 Sybil Thorndike as Granny McKinley
 Chips Rafferty as Sergeant Flaxman
 Margaret Christensen as Ma Greevins
 Reg Lye as Pa Greevins
 Grant Taylor as Stiffy
 Guy Doleman as Mr Quirk
Leonard Thiele as Mr Scrivens
Verena Kimmins as Miss MacCowan
Bruce Beeby as Dr Gasper
Ruth Cracknell as Mrs Gaspen
John Fegan as Tom Graham
Brian Farley as Fred
Janice Dinnen as Jean Holt
Barbara Eather as Elsie
William Rees as Mr Protheroe
Gordon Chater as Reverend Galbraith

Production
The novel Smiley had been so popular that author Moore Raymond followed it up with Smiley Gets a Gun in 1947.

The actor who first played Smiley, Colin Petersen, had moved to England, meaning a replacement had to be found. Anthony Kimmins looked at over 4,000 other applicants before finding Keith Calvert. Moore Raymond also had returned to England, writing Smiley comics for Swift Comics.  Kimmins' daughter Verena who helped the young actors in the first Smiley movie had a featured role in the film.

Filming took eight weeks towards the end of 1957. Shooting took place at Camden and Pagewood Studios.

Release
The film was less successful than its predecessor and a proposed third film, Smiley Wins the Ashes, was never made.

References

External links
 
Smiley Gets a Gun at Oz Movies

Australian comedy films
Australian sequel films
British comedy films
British sequel films
1958 films
1958 comedy films
CinemaScope films
Films based on Australian novels
London Films films
Films directed by Anthony Kimmins
1950s English-language films
1950s British films